Harry L. Swinney (born April 10, 1939) is an American physicist noted for his contributions to the field of nonlinear dynamics.

Personal life
Harry Leonard Swinney was born in Opelousas, Louisiana, on April 10, 1939.  His parents were Leonard R. Swinney and Ethel Bertheaud Swinney. In 1967 Harry Swinney married Gloria T. Luyas, and in 1978 they had a son, Brent Luyas Swinney. Brent died of cancer in 1995 and Gloria died of cancer in 1997.  Harry Swinney married Lizabeth Kelley on August 12, 2000.

Education
Swinney attended elementary school in Austin, Texas, and in 1957 graduated from Homer Louisiana High School. In 1961 he was awarded a B.S. with honors in physics by Southwestern at Memphis (now Rhodes College), where he was inspired by his physics professor and research mentor, Jack H. Taylor.  In 1968 he was awarded a Ph.D. in physics by Johns Hopkins University; his advisor was Herman Z. Cummins.

Career
Swinney was an assistant professor of physics at New York University (1971–73) and was associate professor and then professor at the City College of the City University of New York (1973–78). Since 1978 Swinney has been on the faculty of the University of Texas at Austin, where he is now Sid W. Richardson Foundation Regents Chair of Physics and director of the Center for Nonlinear Dynamics.

Honors
Swinney is a member of the National Academy of Sciences (1992) and a fellow of the American Physical Society (1977), the American Academy of Arts and Sciences (1991), the American Association for the Advancement of Science (1999), and the Society for Industrial and Applied Mathematics (2009). He was awarded the American Physical Society Fluid Dynamics Prize (1995), the Society for Industrial and Applied Mathematics Jürgen Moser Prize (2007), the European Geosciences Union Richardson Medal (2012), and the Boltzmann Medal (2013) of the Commission on Statistical Physics of the International Union of Pure and Applied Physics. He was a Guggenheim Fellow (1983–84) and he was inducted into The Johns Hopkins University Society of Scholars (1984). He was awarded honorary doctoral degrees by Rhodes College (2002), The Hebrew University of Jerusalem (2008), and the University of Buenos Aires (2010).

Research contributions
Swinney conducts research on instabilities, chaos, and pattern formation in diverse systems, including fluid, chemical, and granular media. Swinney together with his students, postdocs, and other collaborators have:  
determined the decay rate of order parameter fluctuations for fluids near the critical point 
observed a transition to chaos—deterministic yet nonperiodic behavior—in experiments on a fluid flow 
characterized chaos from time series data by computing the largest Lyapunov exponent (rate of loss of predictability)  and the mutual information (general dependence of two variables) 
discovered multiple transitions to different patterns of fluid flow between concentric independently rotating cylinders 
designed a laboratory experiment that yielded a stable vortex for conditions mimicking those on Jupiter. This result provides a plausible explanation of the stability of Jupiter's Great Red Spot, which was first observed by Robert Hooke in 1664.
observed the emergence of a spatial pattern in a chemical system, as predicted in 1952 by Alan Turing
determined the scaling of power dissipated in strongly turbulent flow between concentric rotating cylinders 
observed anomalous diffusion and Lévy flights in a fluid flow 
discovered localized structures, dubbed "oscillons", in an oscillating granular layer; oscillons were subsequently found in many dynamical systems.  The granular experiments also investigated various extended spatial patterns, shock waves, and fluctuations. 
observed resonant pattern formation with frequency locking in chemical systems 
found fractal cascades of waves on the edges of leaves, flowers, and garbage bags 
found a resonance in internal wave boundary currents generated by tidal flow on a slope; this resonance apparently selects the angle (typically three degrees) of the continental slopes of the oceans  
discovered a new protein, Slf, which is produced by neighboring colonies of Paenibacillus dendritiformis bacteria. Slf is lethal to bacteria near the edge of a colony that faces another P. dendritiformis colony.
found that fluctuations in the number N of bacteria swimming in a volume varied as N^(3/4), in contrast to the N^(1/2) scaling of fluctuations for systems in thermodynamic equilibrium

Other
Swinney, together with Rajarshi Roy and Kenneth Showalter, founded a two-week Hands-On Research School for early career scientists from developing countries: handsonresearch.org. The schools, sponsored by the International Centre for Theoretical Physics, are described in a 3-minute video here.

References

External links 
 Homepage of H.L. Swinney at the University of Texas at Austin
 List of H.L. Swinney's students and postdocs
 Current research

1939 births
Living people
21st-century American physicists
Chaos theorists
University of Texas at Austin faculty
Fellows of the Society for Industrial and Applied Mathematics
Johns Hopkins University alumni
Members of the United States National Academy of Sciences
Rhodes College alumni
Fellows of the American Physical Society